Faisla is a  1988 Hindi hit film starring Ashok Kumar,  Vinod Khanna, Vinod Mehra,  Saira Banu, Ranjeet, Sujit Kumar, Bindu & Mehmood. The film was directed by S. Ramanathan.

Plot
Three convicts escape from prison to avenge the rape and death of one of their daughters', and get involved in a mansion's mystery involving the death of the owner, allegedly at the hands of his son; and the accidental loss of sight by his daughter; and the cruel and heartless thugs who will kill anyone who stand in their way, including each other.

Cast
 Ashok Kumar as Rehman
 Vinod Khanna as Birju
 Vinod Mehra as CID Inspector Ashok Verma / Bansi
 Saira Banu as Radha
 Ranjeet as Rana
 Sujit Kumar as Vikram
 Bindu as Rita
 Mehmood as Jaggu

Soundtrack
All songs are music by R. D. Burman.

References

External links
 

1985 films
1980s Hindi-language films
Films directed by S. Ramanathan
Films scored by R. D. Burman